Agaronia hiatula is a species of sea snail, a marine gastropod mollusk in the family Olividae, the olives.

Description

Distribution

References

 Duclos P.L. (1844–1848). Oliva. In J.C. Chenu, Illustrations conchyliologiques ou description et figures de toutes les coquilles connues vivantes et fossiles, classées suivant le système de Lamarck modifié d'après les progrès de la science et comprenant les genres nouveaux et les espèces récemment découvertes: 5–28 [1844]; 29–31, pls 1–36 [1845]; 1–4 [1848].

External links
 Gmelin J.F. (1791). Vermes. In: Gmelin J.F. (Ed.) Caroli a Linnaei Systema Naturae per Regna Tria Naturae, Ed. 13. Tome 1(6). G.E. Beer, Lipsiae [Leipzig]. pp. 3021–3910
 uclos, P. L. (1835–1840). Histoire naturelle générale et particulière de tous les genres de coquilles univalves marines a l'état vivant et fossile publiée par monographie. Genre Olive. Paris: Institut de France. 33 plates: pls 1–12 [1835], pls 13–33

Olividae
Gastropods described in 1791
Taxa named by Johann Friedrich Gmelin